Period of Adjustment is a 1962 American comedy-drama film directed by George Roy Hill from a screenplay written by Isobel Lennart, based on Tennessee Williams' 1960 play of the same name and stars Tony Franciosa, Jane Fonda, Jim Hutton, and Lois Nettleton. In the film; a newlywed couple on their honeymoon visit friends who are having marital problems of their own.

Period of Adjustment was theatrically released on October 31, 1962 by Metro-Goldwyn-Mayer. It received generally positive reviews from critics and was a moderate box office success grossing $4 million against a $1.9 million budget. The film marked Roy Hill's directorial debut and launched Fonda to bankable film stardom, also earning her a nomination for the Golden Globe Award for Best Actress – Motion Picture Comedy or Musical.

Plot
On Christmas Eve, two couples are experiencing a period of difficulty in their marital relationships. Newlyweds Isabel (Jane Fonda) and George Haverstick (Jim Hutton) (who had met when she was his hospital nurse), are having a problem because George has bouts of sexual performance anxiety and has quit his job without telling her. The second couple, Ralph (Anthony Franciosa) (a former Korean War buddy of George) and Dorothea Baitz (Lois Nettleton), have their problems based on the fact that he married her only for her money—and she knows it, and he dislikes her wealthy parents. The couples individually counsel each other about their insecurities, problems, and plans while drinking in the Tennessee home of one of them.

Cast
 Tony Franciosa as Ralph Baitz (as Tony Franciosa)
 Jane Fonda as Isabel Haverstick
 Jim Hutton as George Haverstick
 Lois Nettleton as Dorothea Baitz
 John McGiver as Stewart P. McGill
 Mabel Albertson as Mrs. Alice McGill
 Jack Albertson as Desk Sergeant

Reception
According to MGM records, the film earned $2,750,000 in North America and $1.5 million overseas, making the studio a profit of $558,000.

Awards and nominations

See also
 List of Christmas films

References

External links
 
 
 
 
 

1962 films
1962 drama films
1960s Christmas comedy-drama films
1960s Christmas films
1960s romantic comedy-drama films
1962 directorial debut films
1962 comedy films
American black-and-white films
American Christmas comedy-drama films
American films based on plays
American romantic comedy-drama films
Films based on works by Tennessee Williams
Films directed by George Roy Hill
Films scored by Lyn Murray
Films set in Tennessee
Metro-Goldwyn-Mayer films
1960s English-language films
1960s American films